Syrian Catholic may refer to:

 The Catholic Church in Syria, part of the worldwide Catholic Church in the country of Syria
 The Syriac Catholic Church, one of 23 Eastern Catholic Churches, that uses the West Syriac liturgy and has many practices and rites in common with the Syriac Orthodox Church.

See also
 
 Syrian (disambiguation)
 Catholic (disambiguation)
 Catholic Syrian Bank, an Indian bank
 Syriac Christianity